For a cryptographic hash function (a mathematical algorithm), a MASH-1 (Modular Arithmetic Secure Hash) is a hash function based on modular arithmetic.

History 
Despite many proposals, few hash functions based on modular arithmetic have withstood attack, and most that have tend to be relatively inefficient.  MASH-1 evolved from a long line of related proposals successively broken and repaired.

Standard 
Committee Draft ISO/IEC 10118-4 (Nov 95)

Description 

The message is padded by appending the message length and is separated into blocks  of length . These blocks are processed iteratively by a compression function:

From  are now calculated more data blocks  by linear operations (where  denotes concatenation):

These data blocks are now enlarged to  like above, and with these the compression process continues with eight more steps:

MASH-2 
There is a newer version of the algorithm called MASH-2 with a different exponent. This is the only difference between these versions.

References 

 A. Menezes, P. van Oorschot, S. Vanstone, Handbook of Applied Cryptography, 

Cryptographic hash functions